Kathleen Rochelle was an American Democratic politician from Lusk, Wyoming. She represented the Niobrara district in the Wyoming House of Representatives in 1926 and 1932.

References

Year of birth missing
Year of death missing
Members of the Wyoming House of Representatives
Women state legislators in Wyoming
20th-century American women politicians
People from Lusk, Wyoming